The Hans Beimler Medal was a GDR decoration. The medal was instituted on 17 May 1956 and was awarded to East Germans who fought in the Spanish civil war on the side of the republicans. The medal was named after Hans Beimler, the first commissar of the German Communist contingent and the XI International Brigade in Spain. The medal was presented in the name of the Chairman of the Council of Ministers.

Placement 
The medal was displayed on the upper left chest when worn and was positioned between the Medal for Fighters against Fascism and the Clara Zetkin Medal in the order of precedence.

Design

Medal 
Obverse
The medal is round, on the front there is a depicting of Hans Beimler surrounded with its name and the dates of his birth and death (1895–1936).
Reverse
On the center of the reverse there is a three-pointed star, the emblem of the International Brigades surrounded with the words "INTERNATIONALE BRIGADEN" (INTERNATIONAL BRIGADES) and "KAMPFER SPANIENS FREIHEIT 1936–1939" (FIGHTERS FOR SPANISH LIBERTY 1936–1939).

Ribbon and Bar 

The medal is suspended from rectangular ribbon bar (the ribbon is in full length in the version for army members) of red, yellow, and violet horizontal strips in equal proportion, these were the colors of the Spanish Republican Flag. On the outer edges of both sides are narrow vertical strips of black, red, and gold, the colors of the German Flag.

See also 
 Awards and decorations of East Germany
 Spanish Cross

References 

Orders, decorations, and medals of East Germany
Awards established in 1956
1956 establishments in East Germany
Military awards and decorations of the Spanish Civil War
German campaign medals
Germany–Spain military relations